Myrtle Bank is a rural locality in the local government area of Launceston, in the Northern region of Tasmania. The 2016 census determined a population of 40 for the state suburb of Myrtle Bank.

History
The locality was gazetted in 1963.

Geography
The St Patricks River forms part of the south-eastern boundary.

Road infrastructure
The Tasman Highway (A3) passes through the eastern corner of the locality. The C828 route (Targa Hill Road) enters from the south-east and runs through to the south-west boundary, where it ends.

References

Launceston, Tasmania
Localities of City of Launceston
Towns in Tasmania